The 1985 Singaporean presidential election was held to elect the next president of Singapore.Wee Kim Wee was elected by the Parliament of Singapore.

During the election, 73 members of Parliament were present and five members were absent.

Wee was sworn in as president on 2 September 1985.

Results

References

Presidential elections in Singapore
Singapore
Presidential election